The 2020 Monmouth Hawks football team represented Monmouth University in the 2020 NCAA Division I FCS football season as a member of the Big South Conference. They will be led by 28th-year head coach Kevin Callahan and play their home games at Kessler Field in West Long Branch, New Jersey.

On July 27, it was announced that Monmouth would cancel its fall sports seasons due to the COVID-19 pandemic. Playing fall sports, including football, in the fall has not been ruled out.

Previous season

The Hawks finished the 2019 season 11–3, 6–0 in Big South play to win the Big South conference championship. The Hawks received the Big South's automatic bid to the FCS Playoffs. They defeated Holy Cross in the first round before losing to James Madison in the second round.

Preseason

Polls
In June 2020, the Hawks were predicted to finish second in the Big South by a panel of media and head coaches.

Schedule
Monmouth had games scheduled against Rutgers (September 5), Albany (September 12), Maine (September 19), Fordham (September 26), and Hampton (November 7), which were all later canceled before the start of the 2020 season.

References

Monmouth
Monmouth Hawks football seasons
Big South Conference football champion seasons
Monmouth
Monmouth Hawks football